This is a list of the extreme points of Luxembourg, the points that are farther north, south, east or west, higher or lower than any other location in the territory of the state.

Latitude and longitude
Northernmost point — in Troisvierges, Clervaux Canton
Southernmost point — near Rumelange, Esch-sur-Alzette Canton
Easternmost point — on Sauer River in Rosport-Mompach, Echternach Canton
Westernmost point — near Surré, Wiltz Canton
Geographical Center — near Bissen

Elevation
Highest point — Kneiff, in Troisvierges (559.8 m)
Lowest point — confluence of Sauer and Moselle Rivers, in Wasserbillig (129.9 m)

See also
Extreme points of Earth
Geography of Luxembourg

Geography of Luxembourg
Luxembourg
Extreme
Extreme points